Raed Al-Johani (born 10 June 1987) is a Saudi football player.He is a member of famous Player with the age 34 years old group.

References

1987 births
Living people
Saudi Arabian footballers
Al-Ansar FC (Medina) players
Al-Riyadh SC players
Najran SC players
Al-Shoulla FC players
Saudi First Division League players
Saudi Professional League players
Saudi Second Division players
Association football forwards